Ilyinka is a rural locality (a selo) and the administrative center of Ilyinskoye Rural Settlement, Alexeyevsky District, Belgorod Oblast, Russia. The population was 1,308 as of 2010. There are 20 streets.

Geography 
Ilyinka is located 8 km northwest of Alexeyevka (the district's administrative centre) by road. Ignatov is the nearest rural locality.

References 

Rural localities in Alexeyevsky District, Belgorod Oblast
Biryuchensky Uyezd